Kim Hyung-soo may refer to:
K.Will (born Kim Hyung-soo, 1981), South Korean ballad singer-songwriter
Lee Wan (born Kim Hyung-soo, 1984), South Korean actor
Brother Su (born Kim Hyungsoo, 1990), South Korean singer-songwriter
Kim Hyung-su, magistrate of Yeongdeungpo District

See also
Kim Hyun-soo (disambiguation)